Ali Shirazi is a senior Iranian cleric who is Supreme Leader Ayatollah Ali Khamenei's representative to the Islamic Revolutionary Guard Corps–Quds Force (IRGC-QF). He holds the clerical ranking of Hojatoleslam, which is the rank below Ayatollah.

In February 2015, Shirazi said, "We shall not rest until we raise the flag of Islam over the White House."

References

Living people
Iranian Shia clerics
Year of birth missing (living people)